The Dutch Basketball Supercup, also known as the DBL Supercup, is the super cup competition of professional basketball in the Netherlands. The match is played by the champions of the Dutch Basketball League and the winner of the NBB Cup. It is a super cup competition. The first Supercup game was held in 2011.

The Supercup has three record titles holders, Heroes Den Bosch, Donar and ZZ Leiden have won three titles each. Two other teams have played in the game so far: Landstede Hammers and BAL.

Title holders 

 2011  Leiden (ZZ)
 2012  Leiden (ZZ)
 2013  Den Bosch (SPM Shoeters)
 2014  Donar (GasTerra Flames)
 2015  Den Bosch (SPM Shoeters)
 2016  Donar 
 2017  Landstede Zwolle
 2018  Donar 
 2019  Landstede Hammers
 2021  Leiden (ZZ)
 2022  Heroes Den Bosch

Games

Performance by club 
Donar, Heroes Den Bosch and ZZ Leiden hold the shared record for most Supercup titles with 3, while Leiden and Donar have both played in 7 games.

Top scorers
The record for most scored points in a Supercup game is 26, by Jordan Johnson of the Landstede Hammers in the 2018 edition. DeJuan Wright is the only player to be top scorer in the SuperCup twice, in 2012 and 2014.

Notes

References

See also 
 Dutch Basketball League
 Basketball Cup

 
Supercup
Basketball supercup competitions in Europe